Qaleh Soltan Baji (also Romanized as Qal‘eh Solţān Bājī, Qal‘eh-ye Solţān Bājī, and Qal‘eh-ye Soltān Bājī; also known as Sultānbāji) is a village in Qomrud Rural District, in the Central District of Qom County, Qom Province, Iran. At the 2006 census, its population was 247, in 54 families.

References 

Populated places in Qom Province